Annual Awards of Estonian Theatre are annual theatrical awards issued by Estonian Theatre Union. Awards are given out to recognize persons and organizations on account of theirs theatrical achievements for Estonian theatre.

Awards are issued since 1961, and it takes place every year on 27 March.

Categories

There are many categories of awards, and also awards named after Estonian theatrical personnel:
 Award for theatrical director 
 Award for theatrical artist

Awards named after Estonian theatrical personnel

 Ants Lauter Award (annually, since 1974)
 Georg Ots Musical Theatre Award  (biannually)

References

External links
 Annual Awards of Estonian Theatre at Estonian Theatre Union's website

Estonian awards
Theatre in Estonia